Melanogastraceae is a family of fungi in the order Boletales.

References

Boletales